Jean-Christophe Thouvenel (born 8 October 1958 in Colmar) is a French former professional Association football player.

Thouvenel was a member of the French squad that won the gold medal at the 1984 Summer Olympics in Los Angeles, California.

Honours

Swiss Cup:
 1977–78

French Division 1:
 1983–84, 1984–85, 1986–87

Coupe de France:
 1985–86, 1986–87

References 
 http://www.fff.fr/servfff/historique/historique.php?id=THOUVENEL%20Jean-Christophe
 

1958 births
Living people
Sportspeople from Colmar
French footballers
France international footballers
Servette FC players
Paris FC players
FC Girondins de Bordeaux players
Le Havre AC players
Ligue 1 players
Footballers at the 1984 Summer Olympics
Olympic footballers of France
Olympic gold medalists for France
Olympic medalists in football
Medalists at the 1984 Summer Olympics
Association football defenders
Footballers from Alsace